The Westchester County Clerk is the oldest elected office in Westchester County, New York, having been established in 1683. The County Clerk is charged with  maintaining and preserving the official documents and records of the county thereof. The current Westchester County Clerk is Timothy C. Idoni.

The Westchester County Clerk is the Registrar of county land transactions and liens as well as the Court clerk of the Supreme Court and County Court. The position is both a County Official and a New York State Constitutional Officer.

List of County Clerks

References

External links

 

County clerks in New York (state)
County government agencies in New York (state)
Westchester County, New York